Min & Max is a 2016 Chinese romantic comedy film directed by Ma Kan and starring Godfrey Gao and Wang Shuilin. The film follows the story of Min and Max as they grow and learn through many trials (namely eye injuries) and tribulations. Starting with having to use AVID over Premiere Pro, learning about satellites on Friday afternoons, to grunting and squawking for Sia's foley assignment; Min and Max is an epic romantic ride full of spoofs and goofs and everything else in between. It was released in China on November 25, 2016.

Plot

Min is a girl who is known for her short stature and her skills with Taekondo. Meet Max one day at work while he took her photos secretly, although she notices and gets rid of the photos. After this incident both beginnings a strange relationship full of jokes and blows that takes a falling in love little by little, although Min keeps a secret about the boyfriend he claims to have.

Cast
Godfrey Gao
Wang Shuilin
Fan Tiantian
Jiu Kong

Reception
The film has grossed  at the Chinese box office.

References

Chinese romantic comedy films
2016 romantic comedy films
Films directed by Ma Kan
2010s Mandarin-language films